Rath is a small town with a municipal board in Hamirpur district in the Indian state of Uttar Pradesh.  Rath is a Tehsil of Hamirpur District. It is situated 506 km southeast of New Delhi.

History
The general belief is that Rath's name comes from the word "Virat". It is believed to be Virat Nagari, where Pandavas remained in hiding for one year. Virata was the king of Virat Nagari. Yudhishthira was a courtier who used to play Chaupar (the game of dice) with the king. Bhima was a cook. Arjuna lived as Brihannala, a dance teacher of Uttara, daughter of king Virat, who was later married to Abhimanyu. Draupadi was a maid to the queen. The brother of the queen, Kichaka, tried to lure Draupadi and was killed by Bhima near a pond. "Dhupakali pond" in the city is believed to be the pond where Bhima killed Kichaka. Virat later became Rath. Rath is home to the two great Indian Freedom fighters Dewan Shatrughan Singh and Rani Rajendra Kumari. Reverend literacy figure, the great critic of Hindi literature Acharya Ramchandra Shukla, also known as Ramchandra Shukla, started his education from Rath in 1888. It is the home tehsil of Dr Sanjay Pratap Singh, a very famous Indian American physician who is the Chairman of Neurology at Creighton University School of Medicine. He is the grandson of Rani Rajendra Kumari and Dewan Shatrughan Singh.

Geography

It has an average elevation of 165 meters (541 feet) above sea level. It has a minimum temperature of 10 °C and a maximum of 47 °C.

Transportation

Airways
Rath is served by the Khajuraho airport (110 km). Kanpur (145 km) and Lucknow (225 km) airports are nearby.

Roadways

Rath is connected with UPSH-21 (Bilaraya to Panwari) and UPSH-42 (Hamirpur to Jhansi). There are other roads like MDR-41B that link Rath to other parts of the state. UPSRTC and private bus services provide transportation to other cities. Rath has one Bus Terminal and other bus stands, including Orai, Charkhari bus stand (near Ramleela maidan), and Jalalpur Bus. Regular bus services are available to nearby towns like Mahoba, Banda, Maudaha, Orai, Chitrakoot, Hamirpur. Rath is also well connected with Allahabad, Varanasi, Kanpur, Lucknow, Delhi, Agra, Jhansi, Noida, Jaipur, Mathura, and Ajmer.

Railways
Rath is not directly linked with railways. The nearest railway stations are Halparpur which is 45 km away, and Kulpahar, which is 47 km away. Another nearby railway station is Orai, at a distance of 55 km from Rath.

Historical places

There are many historical places in Rath including many temples, gurudwara, churches.
 Rohaniya Mandir:  is a Hindu temple situated in the heart of the town near Ramleela maidan. It is one of the oldest temples.
 Chaupra Mandir:  is a Hindu temple complex in Rath which displays millennia of traditional Indian and Hindu culture, spirituality, and architecture. It is situated on Chopra road 1.8 km from the bus terminal. Chaupreshwar Dham is the biggest temple in the city
 Sankat Mochan Dham:  is a Hanuman mandir. It is situated outside of the city, approximately 5.1 km from the bus terminal on UPSH-42 (Hamirpur Road).
 Shakti Mandir:  is situated on Padav Thiraha 0.2 km from the bus terminal.
 Sheetla Mata Mandir:  is famous shaktipeeth temple situated in Shastri Nagar (Sikandarpura)
 Akhand Dham Ashram:  is located near Mandi Sthal, 1 km from the bus terminal on Jhanshi road. Inside the ashram is present Hanuman temple.
 Ram Bagh, Rath:  is situated near the Orai bus stand on the Orai road.
 Bade-Peer-Sahab Dargah:  is located near the Orai bus stand in the town.
 Nanak Gurudwara:
 Madi Matan:
 Magroth Village:  The village is home to Samadhi of Dewan Shatrughan Singh (Bundelkhand Gandhi) & Rani Rajendra Kumari.
 Gayatri Shakti Peeth:
 Rath Church:  is situated near kotwali Thana Rath. It was established in 1902 inside Anna Hansen Memorial Mission School.
 Shankar Bhagwan Mandir:  It is located near Sanjay Mahan, New Basti Charkhari Road, Sikandarpura.
 Kargawan Village:  The village is the home of Dr Sanjay Pratap Singh - USA.
 Eidgah:  It is situated near Nahar (canal) on Kurra road.
 Meher Dham: It is situated in Nauranga on rath road.

Administration

Local self-government
Rath is governed by a municipality under the Uttar Pradesh Municipal Act. It has a 25 member council. The council is chaired by a chairperson who is directly elected by more than 35,000 electorates. The council is called Nagar Palika.

Sub district administration
Rath is the headquarters of the subdivision, which is headed by a Sub-Divisional Magistrate (S.D.M.). The same officer holds the court of City Magistrate of Rath. SDM is assisted by four officers, one Tehsil Magistrate and three Nayab Tehsil Magistrates. Tehsildar looks into the revenue matter of the whole of sub-district and is assisted by three nayabs who look after the three divisions of Rath, namely Majgawan, Amgaon, and Rath city.

Police administration
Rath DSP maintains rath city's security. An officer of the cadre of Deputy Superintendent of Police (C.O.) heads the Rath's police administration. Rath Kotwali is headed by Kotwal, an officer of Inspector cadre. Rath police circle consists of 2 police stations, namely:
 Rath City Kotwali
 Majhgawan Thana
 Hamirpur Chungi
 Ramlila Maidan
 Orai Road
 Kot Bazar
 Barakhamba
 Bajariya
 Chaupra Mandir
 Padav (BUS STAND)

Demographics
As of the 2011 Census of India, Rath had a population of 65,056. Males constitute 54% of the people, and females 46%. Rath has an average literacy rate of 61%, higher than the national average of 59.5%: male literacy is 70%, and female literacy is 50%. In Rath, 15% of the population is under six years of age.

References

Cities and towns in Hamirpur district, Uttar Pradesh
Cities in Bundelkhand